Delbaran (also Romanized as Delbarān; also known as Dīlbarān) is a city in the Central District of Qorveh County, Kurdistan Province, Iran. At the 2006 census, its population was 6,104, in 1,395 families.

Language 
Linguistic composition of the city:

References

Towns and villages in Qorveh County
Cities in Kurdistan Province
Azerbaijani settlements in Kurdistan Province